, there were 3,410 electric vehicles registered in Oklahoma.

In 2019, Oklahoma was ranked by YourMechanic as the best state in the U.S. for electric vehicle ownership.

Government policy
In 2021, the state government introduced an annual registration fee of $110 for electric vehicles, and $82 for plug-in hybrid vehicles; this fee will take effect in 2024.

In 2021, the state government introduced a tax of $0.03/kWh on electricity used for electric vehicle charging.

Charging stations
, there were about 1,000 charging stations in Oklahoma.

The Infrastructure Investment and Jobs Act, signed into law in November 2021, allocates  to charging stations in Oklahoma.

Manufacturing
Many politicians, including Governor Kevin Stitt, have promoted the state's capacity for electric vehicle manufacturing.

By region

Oklahoma City
, there were 240 charging stations in Oklahoma City.

Tulsa
, there were four electric vehicles in the fleet of the Metropolitan Tulsa Transit Authority.

References

Oklahoma
Road transportation in Oklahoma